"Another Time, Another Place" is the sixteenth episode of the first series of Space: 1999.  The screenplay was written by Johnny Byrne; the director was David Tomblin.  The final shooting script is dated 20 January 1974, with blue-page amendments dated 25 January and 1 April 1974.  Live-action filming took place Tuesday 2 April 1974 through Friday 19 April 1974.  Two days of second-unit filming took place Tuesday 23 April 1974 and Thursday 25 April 1974 during the production of "Missing Link".

Story 
It is a routine 'morning' on Moonbase Alpha.  As Regina Kesslann passes through Main Mission on an errand, she pauses in mid-step, sensing something amiss.  Soon after, the entire community experiences the same nameless apprehension.  The cause is as yet undetected by the instruments:  a tremendous, swirling mass of energy looming in the path of the speeding Moon.  Once in range, the Moon is jerked forward by the anomaly's intense gravitational force.  Everyone is sent reeling as the Moon plunges into the spiralling centre.  Velocity readings go off the dial and the overwhelmed sensors short-circuit.

Falling through a vortex of multi-coloured energy, the Moon is buffeted by violent turbulence.  Regina tries to run from the room, but all motion ceases as the Moon arrives in the still, timeless centre of the anomaly—and everyone acquires a ghostly facsimile.  As a duplicate Moon separates from the original, the doppelgängers peel away one by one, each leaving its original with a twinge of angst.  At a window, Helena Russell watches the other Moon speed off into the distance.  Finally, everything vanishes in a blaze of white light—

—which fades to find the Moon in normal space and the population of Alpha regaining consciousness.  John Koenig organises repair operations and calls a medical team for the still-unconscious Regina.  He approaches Victor Bergman for an explanation.  The professor is baffled, as they are now in a completely different region of space.  The anomaly must have propelled them uncountable billions of miles in a matter of seconds.  Koenig joins Helena in the diagnostic unit, where a comatose Regina is not responding to treatment.  While everyone else experienced similar symptoms—shock, headaches, double-vision—and recovered, Regina's condition is deteriorating.

As the repairs progress, they discover the Moon is approaching a new solar system.   Suddenly, Regina awakens, disoriented and talking nonsense:  she was up 'there' again...she saw two Moons...how everyone was 'there', including Alan and the Commander...but it must have been a dream, because Alan and the Commander are dead...no, they're not dead.  Helena ends this schizophrenic exchange by assuring her the two men are not dead.  Relieved, Regina gazes up at the ceiling, commenting on how hot the sun is today.  The doctor examines the girl's hand and finds it sunburned.

Koenig meets with Helena for an update on Regina's condition.  Aside from the inexplicable sunburn, the girl believes she is living on a planet; from her perspective, her present life on Alpha no longer exists.  Helena rejects suggestions that this is déjà vu or a classic case of psychological regression.  The world of Regina's delusion is hardly ideal—especially as she is mourning the deaths of Koenig and Alan Carter.  Since the Moon seems to have travelled faster than the speed of light, Bergman speculates time could be a factor.  Regina could be living a past or future life, but feeling it in the present.

With the repairs completed, scans of the solar system reveal nine planets orbiting a yellow star. When long-range scanners are focused on the familiar-appearing third planet, Computer confirms it to be Earth.  Furthermore, the Moon is slowing down and on a course to re-enter orbit.  In private, a skeptical Koenig says that while he can accept that a chance encounter with a spatial anomaly could have shifted them across space, he cannot conceive it placing the Moon on a trajectory to re-establish its former orbit around Earth.  Bergman is philosophic; there must be a fundamental sense of order to the universe that even Man's worst blunders (such as blasting the Moon out of orbit) cannot alter.

Though still living in her fantasy world, Regina is on the mend.  Happily painting a picture, she attributes her recovery to the return of her husband, Alan.  The sudden realisation that he has not yet come to visit upsets her.  Helena's excuses only make matters worse.  After a moment's thought, the doctor promises he will come.  She summons Carter to the Medical Section, interrupting his meeting with the Commander.  The astronaut insists on sending a reconnaissance flight to Earth, but Koenig's decision is final:  no one will be allowed down to the surface until the Moon is safely in orbit.

Reporting to Medical, Carter is stunned when Regina hurls herself into his arms.  One minute she is weeping with pleasure at the sight of him, the next she is hysterically screaming he is dead.  Helena is forced to sedate her.  The doctor informs a bewildered Carter of her intention:  to jolt Regina out of her delusion with the shock of seeing him—her dead husband back from the grave.  She shows him the picture Regina has painted of her world: a geodesic house sitting in a field of flowers with a cheerful sun in the sky.

Continuous hails to the World Space Commission—or any Earth station—go unanswered.  Koenig makes a base-wide announcement, reporting that Phase One of Operation Exodus (a reconnaissance probe of the surface) will be launched as soon as the Moon has safely settled into Earth orbit.  Hearing his words, Regina awakens to a nightmare vision of a black-cloaked figure beckoning to her.  She approaches and realises its face to be her own, older and saddened.  After experiencing a sharp spasm of pain, she looks again:  the face is now a skull.  Terrified, she runs away—to be brought up short by her own reflection in an endless mirror.

Screaming, Regina lashes out and smashes the mirror.  Escaping from the care unit using Dr Mathias's comlock, she encounters a patrolling Security guard.  In her madness, she clobbers him and takes his weapon.  In Main Mission, the joyous announcement of the Moon's re-entry into Earth orbit is interrupted by Regina, wielding a stun-gun in one hand and holding her pain-wracked head with the other.  Hysterical, she rejects all attempts to calm her, having eyes only for Carter.  The girl flings herself into his arms, whispering, 'I knew you didn't die, I knew.'  She convulses in agony, then goes limp.  She is dead.

Later, Bergman privately briefs Koenig on a startling revelation:  the world, as they knew it, has been destroyed.  A five-degree deviation in the tilt of Earth's axis has resulted in devastating geological and climatic changes.  The only remotely habitable area is a site in southern California known as Santa Maria.  Helena joins them with the results of Regina's autopsy.  What she thought was a mental condition had an underlying physical cause—the girl's skull contained two separate brains, and the resulting pressure killed her.  Further discussion is interrupted by an urgent summons.  A celestial object is moving out from behind Earth.

It is the duplicate Moon...from which they receive what sounds like their own Moonbase navigation signal.  Bergman muses they have somehow caught up with themselves.  Koenig and Carter fly to this other Moon.  They find another Moonbase, deserted and stripped of all equipment—the result of Operation Exodus.  Further investigation reveals a crashed Eagle straddling the rim of the crater.  Boarding the wreck, they find two dead astronauts still strapped in their seats.  Wiping the dust from their helmet visors, they find themselves face to face with their dead selves.

Helena's post mortem reveals the duplicate Koenig and Carter died five years earlier, killed on impact when their Eagle crashed.  Koenig reckons the rest of the duplicate Alphans settled at Santa Maria.  Helena agrees, feeling Regina's 'delusions' were telling them that all along.  If they encounter their 'other selves', she fears what happened to Regina could happen to them all.  However, unexpected events force Koenig to initiate Operation Exodus.  The duplicate Moon has increased velocity—moving in the same orbit as theirs, it will collide with them in less than two days.

With evacuation to Earth now a necessity, they must quickly assess the situation.  Helena insists that only Koenig and Carter should go, as their other selves are dead—though she, too, must go to study the medical implications.  They arrive at Santa Maria in the middle of the night, finding a settlement in a desolate valley.  They land at a distance and continue on foot, Helena plagued by a nameless anxiety.  On arrival, they see dwellings identical to those in Regina's painting.  Sending the others out to reconnoitre, Koenig approaches the nearest geodesic house.  He watches a figure making observations with a telescope.  It is a duplicate Bergman.

The older man seems troubled by the Moon he sees, as if it were in the wrong part of the sky; he keeps looking to the other side of the sky...where the other Moon emerges from behind a cloud bank.  When Koenig steps out of the shadows, Earth Bergman does not seem at all surprised.  At another living unit, Carter peeks through a window.  He sees an older Sandra and another woman preparing a meal.  He is startled by the identity of the other woman and tries to prevent Helena from looking.  She is drawn to the window—and sees her older self.  The two identical women lock eyes.  Sandra shrieks in horror, bringing the Earth settlers out in force to confront some very familiar intruders.

At daybreak, Bergman putters in his garden while conversing with Koenig.  He tells him that this is Earth, but not the world they knew.  It is a past or future Earth, perhaps one where they never existed.  Apart from their community, the planet is empty (aside from artefacts of an extinct civilisation).  They are interrupted by the antics of two children—Paul and Sandra Morrow's offspring.  Koenig admires the settlers' fortitude and commends the decision to bring back life to this dead world.  Bergman wryly replies that Koenig should approve:  he made it in the first place.

Carter visits Earth Regina's grave.  Earth Morrow informs him that she died after an unnaturally violent storm.  Carter reckons that was when they came into orbit and his Regina died, too.  Morrow does not feel this is a coincidence.  During this, the two Helenas meet.  They reflect on how they were once one person but are now two separate individuals existing at the same time.  Earth Helena knows her life here is at an end.  'Death' is a means of returning to herself and to those she loves—especially her husband, John Koenig.  She leaves the living unit to find him.  She walks over to Koenig and, without a word, they share one tender kiss before she dies in his arms.

Enraged, the Earth settlers demand that the Alphans leave immediately.  Koenig tries to reason with them, but weapons are soon drawn.  Bergman intercedes.  He proclaims that, though they are the same people, they are trapped in different times.  Should another set of Alphans come and settle on Earth, chaos and disaster would reign; as witnessed, both Regina and Helena died when confronted with their other selves.  The coming collision, however, will restore normality...leaving one Moon, one community, one time.  He ominously concludes if the Alphans are not on their own Moon when time corrects itself, they will have nowhere to die.

After returning to Moonbase, Koenig and company solemnly await the collision.  When the two Moons touch, they create a space-time schism—returning both to the chaos of the anomaly.  There, the Moons merge to form a single Moon.  Once complete, everything vanishes in a burst of white light—which fades as the Alphans awaken to find they are again in a different part of space.  Carter wonders if the other Alphans also survived.  Koenig questions if they ever really existed. Helena then reaches down and retrieves something that had fallen to the floor...a bouquet of roses given to her by Earth Bergman from his garden.

Cast

Starring 
 Martin Landau — Commander John Koenig
 Barbara Bain — Doctor Helena Russell

Also starring 
 Barry Morse — Professor Victor Bergman

Guest artist 
 Judy Geeson — Regina Kesslann

Featuring 
 Prentis Hancock — Controller Paul Morrow
 Clifton Jones — David Kano
 Zienia Merton — Sandra Benes
 Anton Phillips — Doctor Bob Mathias
 Nick Tate — Captain Alan Carter

Uncredited artists 
 Suzanne Roquette — Tanya
 Tony Allyn — Security Guard
 Alan Roberto — Morrow Boy
 Claire McLellan — Morrow Girl
 Barbara Kelly — Computer Voice

Music 

An original score was composed for this episode by Barry Gray.  Tracks from this episode are used more often than those from any of the other four Gray compositions when scoring subsequent episodes.  During the meeting of the two Helenas on Earth, a track of electronic music from UFO (also by Gray) can be heard.

Production notes 

 "Another Time, Another Place" was Johnny Byrne's first original script for the series after his original six-week stint on the Space: 1999 production staff was extended to full-time script editor.  He started with the concept of the worst thing he could imagine happening to the Alphans: hitting a 'mad cloud or particle storm in space' that causes their bodies to separate into duplicates.  With that concept forming the episode's hook, he then had to conceive the next four acts of storyline to reach the conclusion of the Alphans coming face-to-face with themselves.  The story would highlight the cyclic nature of human experience—the catastrophic failure of the 20th Century 'techno-man' resulting in a new beginning of the process emerging from the ashes; this idea would be featured in several of Byrne's scripts for the series.
 The final shooting script contained an unfilmed scene where Koenig, Helena and Carter, making their way to the settlement, encounter the top twenty metres of the Santa Maria satellite tower sticking out of the ashy soil, thus establishing this Earth as their own after the occurrence of some great holocaust.  There is also a reference to the Solar System containing eleven planets; this was changed to nine in the revised draft to make the dénouement of their being back in our solar system more obvious to the viewer.
 The 'This Episode' montage in the episode's opening credits contains an unused effects shot: two glowing geodesic domes sitting on the devastated Earth surface, surrounded by smaller metal pods.  No mention of this shot is found in the script, leaving viewers to speculate if these were meant to be structures built by the Earth settlers (greenhouses, perhaps) or some of the mysterious ruins of the vanished civilisation Bergman mentioned.
 With its alternate-future setting, the episode showed the logical progression of the series' two ongoing relationships: the marriage of Koenig and Helena, whose understated love at first sight romance originated in "Breakaway", as well as Morrow and Sandra, whose chaste affair began during "Black Sun" after the death of Sandra's astronaut beau.

Novelisation 
The episode was adapted in the second Year One Space: 1999 novel Moon Odyssey by John Rankine, published in 1975.

References

External links 
Space: 1999 - "Another Time, Another Place" - The Catacombs episode guide
Space: 1999 - "Another Time, Another Place" - Moonbase Alpha's Space: 1999 page

1976 British television episodes
Space: 1999 episodes